Sruti Mohapatra (born ) is an Indian disability rights activist.

Career 
Sruti Mohapatra was born . She lives in Bhubaneswar, the capital city of Odisha, India. In 1987, she wanted to become an Indian Administrative Service officer after passing the Union Public Service Commission examination but she injured her spinal cord in a car accident. Mohaptra is a wheelchair user who campaigns for disability rights. She has chaired the Odisha State Commission for the Protection of Child Rights and is a member of the National Committee on the Rights of Persons with Disabilities.

In 2009, she won a victory with other activists when the Jagannath Temple at Puri was made accessible to wheelchair users. During the COVID-19 pandemic in India, she warned that 43 per cent of disabled children in Odisha were dropping out of school.

Awards and recognition 
Mohaptra received the Real Heroes Award in 2010. President Ram Nath Kovind presented her with the 2021 Nari Shakti Puraskar on International Women's Day 2022.

References 

1960s births
Indian disability rights activists
Nari Shakti Puraskar winners
People from Bhubaneswar
2020s in Odisha
Living people